A Good Man in Africa is William Boyd's first novel, published in 1981. It won both the Whitbread Book Award for a first novel and the Somerset Maugham Award that year.

Plot introduction
Morgan Leafy is First Secretary to the British Deputy High Commission in Nkongsamba in the fictional West African country of Kinjanja. Leafy's life is becoming increasingly problematic: he is being blackmailed by a local politician, his plan to fix the forthcoming elections has come unstuck, and a coup is looming. In his personal life he has contracted gonorrhea from Hazel, his black mistress who is cheating on him, while Priscilla, his boss's daughter on whom Leafy has lustful ambitions, has just got engaged to his hated underling. To complete his woes Priscilla's father is threatening to dismiss him unless he can dispose of a corpse that has been left to rot in the sun in accordance with tribal laws.

Publication
Morgan Leafy also appears in two short stories, "Next Boat from Douala" and "The Coup" which concern his departure from Africa. The stories appear in the collection On the Yankee Station, published later in 1981, but as Boyd explained in an interview the collection was actually written before the novel, though Boyd claimed he had written both when he sent the collection to potential publishers. Hamish Hamilton agreed to publish the novel (as yet unwritten) and collection in that order, Boyd admits "So I said to my new editor, Christopher Sinclair-Stevenson, 'Look, the manuscript is in a shocking state, I just need a couple of months to knock into shape’, and I sat down and wrote A Good Man in Africa in a white heat of dynamic endeavour in three months at my kitchen table.

Inspiration
William Boyd grew up in Western Africa, living in both Ghana and Nigeria. He explains that the setting for the novel "is completely set in Ibadan in Western Nigeria even though I changed the names, but everybody in it is made up. It’s rooted in my autobiography in terms of its colour, texture and smells but the story is – and that’s something that’s always been the case with me - invented. There is an autobiographical element in that the character of Dr Murray is very much a two-dimensional portrait of my father."

Reception
Michiko Kakutani in The New York Times praises the novel, likening it to the work of Evelyn Waugh and Kingsley Amis: "it is as though Lucky Jim had been suddenly transported to the mythical kingdom of Azania in Black Mischief." She concludes, "There are, of course, things a reader might quarrel with: Mr. Boyd's penchant for broad humor and narrative pratfalls makes, at times, for an irritating glibness; and his technical mastery of the novel form obscures the fact that he has yet to develop a voice that is truly his own - the echoes of his predecessors haunt the achievement of this book. Still, this remains a precocious debut indeed, and I eagerly await Mr. Boyd's next novel".
Kirkus Reviews concludes "Boyd can lapse from credible black-comedy into cheap farce. Still, if the worst of this energetic novel is reminiscent of crude sit-corns, the best recalls Waugh and Amis--in a dark yet cheerful nightmare that's juiced along by humiliation, fury, and a highly unsentimental view of post-colonial Africa."

Adaptations
In 1985 BBC Radio 4 broadcast an audio adaptation starring Alan Rickman as Leafy. It was repeated on BBC Radio 4 Extra in 2022.

In 1994 the novel was made into a film of the same name, with a script written by Boyd.

References 

1981 British novels
Scottish novels
Costa Book Award-winning works
Novels set in Nigeria
British novels adapted into films
Postcolonial novels
Novels by William Boyd (writer)
Hamish Hamilton books
Novels set in Ibadan
1981 debut novels